Jenny Rossander (1837-1887) was a Swedish educator, mathematician, women's rights activist and journalist.

She and her sister Alida Rossander were students of the pioneering Lärokurs för fruntimmer in 1859, were among the first teachers employed when it was transformed to the Högre lärarinneseminariet in 1861, and were fired by Jane Miller Thengberg when the school was given an organized structure in 1864, and in 1865 they became the founders and managers of the Rossander Course. From 1864 she was a journalist of the Home Review.

References 

1837 births
1887 deaths
19th-century Swedish educators
19th-century Swedish women
19th-century Swedish journalists
Swedish mathematicians
Swedish women mathematicians
Mathematics educators